Condobolin railway station is located on the Broken Hill line in New South Wales, Australia. It serves the town of Condobolin.

History
Condobolin station opened on 18 December 1893. It served as the terminus of the Broken Hill line until it was extended to Trida in 1919. The present station building was erected in 1935.

Services
Condobolin is served by NSW TrainLink's weekly Outback Xplorer between Sydney and Broken Hill. NSW TrainLink also operate road coach services to Parkes and Cootamundra.

Great Southern Rail's weekly Indian Pacific passes Condobolin but does not stop at the station.

References

External links

Condobolin station details Transport for New South Wales

Railway stations in Australia opened in 1898
Regional railway stations in New South Wales
Lachlan Shire